Solone Ozero is a small salty lagoon (or liman), which used to be a part of the Burnas Lagoon. Now it is separated from the Burnas Lagoon by the autoroute. The Alkaliya River inflows to the lagoon. The water body is included to the Tuzly Lagoons National Nature Park.

Tuzly Lagoons